ADP-ribosylation factor-like protein 4D is a protein that in humans is encoded by the ARL4D gene.

Function 

ADP-ribosylation factor 4D is a member of the ADP-ribosylation factor family of GTP-binding proteins. ARL4D is closely similar to ARL4A and ARL4C and each has a nuclear localization signal and an unusually high guanine nucleotide exchange rate. This protein may play a role in membrane-associated intracellular trafficking. Mutations in this gene have been associated with Bardet–Biedl syndrome (BBS).

Model organisms				

Model organisms have been used in the study of ARL4D function. A conditional knockout mouse line, called Arl4dtm1a(EUCOMM)Wtsi was generated as part of the International Knockout Mouse Consortium program — a high-throughput mutagenesis project to generate and distribute animal models of disease to interested scientists.

Male and female animals underwent a standardized phenotypic screen to determine the effects of deletion. Twenty five tests were carried out on mutant mice and significant abnormalities were observed. Homozygous mutant females had decreased bone mineral content, heart weight, lean body mass and CD8-positive, alpha-beta memory T cell number. Males had abnormal rib morphology with vertebral transformation. Both sexes displayed a reduction in dorsal third ventricle area and hippocampal area.

References

External links

Further reading 

 
 
 
 
 
 
 
 
 
 

Genes mutated in mice